Dead Island Reveal Trailer is an announcement trailer for the 2011 video game Dead Island, which was developed by Techland and published by Deep Silver. The story of the trailer follows a family who is attacked by a horde of zombies in a hotel. The trailer begins with the infected daughter, who has turned into a zombie, being thrown to her death from a hotel window. The trailer was produced by Glasgow-based Axis Animation, with music created by Giles Lamb.

The trailer was designed to be emotional, allowing players to care for the characters and to be distinct from trailers for the game's competitors. The trailer does not show any actual gameplay, instead telling a short story about the game's world and the background behind its events. The development team also had the goal to show the inevitability and the helplessness of a family in a zombie outbreak.

Upon its release on February 16, 2011, the trailer sparked public interest, and the community reaction led Techland to adjust the content of the actual game. It was met with a positive reception from critics. Praise was directed at the trailer's new ideas, story, immersion and tone. Criticism was reserved for its lack of gameplay information and its depiction of a dead child. Retrospectively, the trailer has been considered as being vastly superior to the actual game and seen as one of the best video game trailers ever made.

Plot
The story is presented in reverse chronological order and in slow motion. The trailer follows a family, consisting of a father, a mother and a daughter, visiting Banoi, an island paradise. After they have settled in a hotel, an unexpected zombie outbreak occurs. The daughter is running away from the horde of zombies in the hotel's corridor and dashing towards her room, where her father and mother are staying, when she is caught. A zombie bites the daughter's legs, causing her to become infected with the zombie virus.

The father opens the door and picks up a fire axe to fight against zombies. He rescues his daughter and brings her inside the hotel room. After placing the injured daughter on a bed, the couple begin fighting the zombies who are breaking into the room. The zombies overwhelm them, and the daughter turns into a zombie and attacks her father, biting him on the neck. To defend himself, the father struggles, trying to push her off, until he throws her out of the window, breaking the glass. The daughter dies on impact with the ground, her eyes reverting to her human form briefly. While the father is struggling, the mother is attacked and eaten by several zombies. The final scene cuts back to the family's arrival to the island, and the family taking a picture together. The corpses of the couple can be seen in a hotel room in the beginning of the game.

Development
Dead Island, originally announced in 2007 by Techland, is an action role-playing survival horror video game. Set in a zombie-infested tropical island called Banoi, the game focuses heavily on melee combat. According to Techland, it was a game about killing zombies, not a game focused on delivering an emotional experience. Until 2011, Techland declined to give new information regarding the game as requested by the game's publisher, Deep Silver. With the lack of new information surrounding the game, many critics believed that the game had been quietly cancelled. The trailer was released on February 16, 2011, approximately four years after the game's initial announcement.

The trailer was produced and made by the Glasgow-based Axis Animation, which had previously created trailers for Killzone 2 and Mass Effect 2. According to Stuart Aitken, Axis's Managing Director and Technical Director and the director of the trailer, Deep Silver gave the team a lot of creative freedom and flexibility in creating the trailer, allowing them to create their own characters instead of using the in-game protagonists. Deep Silver had given them a script and general ideas for them to follow, and the team expanded upon it. In order to make the trailer feel non-linear and focused, the team decided to narrow down the trailer's location to only a single hotel room. Deep Silver wanted the trailer to have some exterior environment. As a result, the team added a segment which has the daughter falling from the hotel window; in the process, audiences glimpse the island setting.

The team hoped that despite the short duration of the trailer, audiences would understand the story and be connected with its characters. They decided that it would be easy for players to identify with a family and that a story involving parents and children could convey the message quickly. They intended to use the trailer to depict the background information of the game, presenting information regarding the "discovery" of the outbreak, its inevitability, and the helplessness of the family. The team had an internal debate on whether the trailer should show guns, ultimately deciding that doing so would distract from the primary goal of the story. The story originally had the mother turn into a zombie, but the team changed it to the daughter, as they considered her more vulnerable when facing a large group of zombies. The team was worried that the action and violence featured would seem excessive, and they decided to alleviate the problem by introducing non-chronological storytelling. Deep Silver also proposed to mitigate the violence by having the trailer presented in slow motion, as they believed that it could make the action feel "balletic" instead of purely violent.

The trailer is made up of computer imagery, and it does not show any actual gameplay footage of Dead Island. The team hoped to use the trailer as a piece of "artwork", stating influence from the Carousel trailer from Philips. The trailer was also designed to showcase "great zombie moments" in an effort to attract the genre's supporters. The actual game development team used the trailer to build up the mood and atmosphere for the game, and they designed quests which required players to help people who had lost their families. They hoped that the mood would make players feel that they were the only hope existing on the island.

The trailer's music was composed by Giles Lamb, who worked for a soundtrack development company called Savalas. The music was designed to be "somber", "melancholy", and "elegant", in contrast with the gore presented in the trailer. The music was designed to be tense when the trailer is depicting violent action, and beautiful during peaceful moments. The team hoped that the music would create a "juxtaposition between beauty and horror".

Popular reaction to the trailer led Techland to slightly adjust the game's tone, gameplay, and story, as well as the game's promotion strategy.

Reception
A week after the release of the trailer, more than one million people had viewed it through YouTube, exceeding Deep Silver's expectation of only 100,000 views. Dead Island also became one of the most searched items on Google, YouTube, and Twitter for several days. Axis was pleasantly surprised at the trailer's popularity. Following the trailer's release, Dead Island became a widely anticipated game.

Many critics praised the trailer's use of reverse storytelling. Keith Stuart from The Guardian compared it favorably to Coldplay's "The Scientist", saying that it successfully delivered an affecting and emotive experience. Mike Fahey from Kotaku called the trailer's use of the dead girl "heartbreaking" and thought that it would be amazing if Techland was able to incorporate these emotional elements into the actual game. Its graphics and pacing also received commendation. The trailer's story was praised for presenting an unconventional take on a zombie apocalypse. Jason Schreier from Wired said that the trailer had successfully made a saturated genre feel fresh again.

The trailer generated controversy around the depiction of the daughter's death. Fahey said that such elements are something video games usually "shy away from", yet it is presented as a main focus in the trailer. Ben Parfitt from MCV found it offensive and thought that the team had stepped across the mark. Defending the trailer, Axis said that their depiction fit the overarching narrative. Robert Rath from The Escapist also liked the segment, calling it "deliberate and necessary", and thought that the overall effect would have been significantly hampered if had been removed from the trailer.

The lack of gameplay information was also criticized. Laura Parker found the trailer disconnected from the actual game, with the trailer being misleading by not showing any in-game information, and with the game failing to deliver the same emotional effect as the trailer. Daemon Hatfield from IGN similarly thought that the trailer was not useful in assessing the game's quality and expressed concerns that the game would not be as entertaining and interesting as the trailer. Upon release, many reviewers thought that the trailer had set expectation too high for the actual game, and that the game ended up not meeting expectations.

The trailer was given a gold award at the Cannes Lions International Festival of Creativity. It was named by gaming journalists as one of the best video game trailers ever made.

Legacy
A live-action remake and a recut version of the trailer which shows the story in a chronological order were released by fans. The announcement trailer also boosted the popularity of Techland and Deep Silver. The announcement trailer for Dead Island: Riptide, released in 2012, featured a similar, depressing tone. A trailer for Goat Simulator in 2014 also mimicked the format of the Dead Island announcement trailer. A movie tie-in based on the trailer was once proposed by Lionsgate, though the project was ultimately cancelled. Deep Silver released a musical tribute to the trailer, coinciding with the launch of Dead Island: Definitive Edition in May 2016.

References

External links 

 
 Trailer at Axis Anima

2011 computer-animated films
2011 short films
2011 films
Advertisements
British animated horror films
Zombie short films
2010s British films
British horror short films
Video game marketing